Edward Fletcher Cass  (12 February 1937 – 17 September 2014) was a British miner, banker and authority on Lancashire folklore, industrial archaeology and the arts who was President of the Manchester Literary and Philosophical Society, Folklore Society, Lancashire and Cheshire Antiquarian Society and Society for Folk Life Studies.

Career

Mining and banking 
Cass was born in Manchester in 1937. He attended the Central High School (later Sheena Simon College) before starting work in a pharmacy and then as a coal miner at Bradford Colliery, Manchester, where he formed an attachment to the National Union of Mineworkers (though not always its leadership) and became friends with Jim Allen. From there he moved to William Deacon's Bank (later Royal Bank of Scotland), where he became a bank manager and studied part-time at the Manchester College of Commerce. He was later elected an Associate of the Chartered Institute of Bankers.

Academia 
Cass continued his studies with an MA (1992) at Manchester Polytechnic (later Manchester Metropolitan University) with a thesis on ‘A Local Newspaper and Its Community: Literature and The Cotton Factory Times, 1885–1937’ and then studied his PhD (1996) at Edge Hill University (awarded by Lancaster University) on "The Cotton Factory Times, 1885–1937: A Family Newspaper and the Lancashire Cotton Community".

He was a Research Fellow of the National Centre for English Cultural Tradition at the University of Sheffield (1997–2004) and then a Research Fellow in The Elphinstone Institute at the University of Aberdeen (2004–14). Cass was involved with The Folklore Society as a Council Member (from 2001) then President (2008–11) and Vice-President (2011–14) and was also involved in The Society for Folk Life Studies first as Council Member (2002–03) then Honorary Secretary (2003–08), Vice-President (2008–11) and President (2011–14) and was awarded their Coote Lake Medal for ‘outstanding research in folklore’.

Other activities 
Cass was Chairman of The Portico Library (1988–90) where he was also a curator of exhibitions, Secretary and Trustee of the National Museum of Labour History later the People's History Museum (1989–2002), President of the Manchester Literary and Philosophical Society (1993–95) and Lancashire and Cheshire Antiquarian Society (2009–12) and was also involved with Manchester's Cornerhouse and Museum of Science and Industry.

Select bibliography 

 The Lancashire Pace-Egg Play: A Social History (FLS Books, 2001).
 The Pace-Egg Plays of the Calder Valley (FLS Books, 2004)
 (with M. J. Preston and Paul Smith), eds, The English Mumming Play: An Introductory Bibliography (FLS Books, 2000).
 with M. J. Preston and Paul Smith), "The Peace Egg Book: An Anglo-Irish Chapbook Connection Discovered" in Folklore (2003).
 Room, Room, Ladies and Gentlemen...: An Introduction to the English Mummers’ Play (English Folk Dance and Song Society in association with The Folklore Society, 2002).

References 

1937 births
2014 deaths
People from Manchester
Manchester Literary and Philosophical Society
Alumni of Manchester Metropolitan University
Alumni of Edge Hill University
20th-century British historians
20th-century English historians
21st-century British historians
21st-century English historians
British folklorists
English folklorists
Presidents of the Folklore Society
Lancashire and Cheshire Antiquarian Society